The  is an art gallery in Osaka, Japan, administered by Osaka Prefecture.

The center started in 1974 as Ōsaka Fumin Gyararī. In 1980 its Japanese name was changed to that used today, on the occasion of its move within Kita-ku (Osaka) from Dōjima to Nakanoshima. In 2000 it moved to Chūō-ku.

The Center has a permanent collection and also holds exhibitions. Its address is Ōtemae 3-1-43, Chūō-ku, Osaka City, postcode 540-0008.

External links
The museum's site 
The museum's site  

Defunct museums in Japan
Art museums established in 1974
1974 establishments in Japan
Art museums disestablished in 2012
2012 disestablishments in Japan